Shepperton Ferry may refer to:

, a train ferry that ran from Dover to Calais between 1935 and 1972
The Shepperton to Weybridge Ferry, a pedestrian and cycle ferry across the River Thames between Shepperton and Weybridge